The 1977–78 Chicago Black Hawks season was the Hawks' 52nd season in the NHL, and the club was coming off a 26–43–11 record, earning 63 points, which was their lowest total since the 1957–58 season.  The Hawks managed to qualify for the playoffs, as they finished in third place in the Smythe Division.  In the playoffs, the Black Hawks were quickly swept out in two games by the Boston Bruins in the NHL Preliminary Round.

Offseason
During the off-season, Hawks general manager Tommy Ivan announced his retirement, and the club decided to not bring interim head coach Bill White back, so the club hired former Los Angeles Kings head coach Bob Pulford to take over both the head coach and general manager position.  Pulford had been the head coach of the Kings from 1972–1977, winning the 1975 Jack Adams Trophy.  The team also named Keith Magnuson as the only team captain, as in the 1976–77 season, the Hawks used Magnuson, Stan Mikita and Pit Martin as tri-captains.

Regular season
The Black Hawks started off the season in a slump, as the team had a 6–10–8 record in their first 24 games.  Chicago eventually snapped out of their funk, and found themselves a season high five games over .500 with a 24–18–16 record late in February.  The Hawks, who were comfortably in first place in the Smythe Division, finished the season with a 32–29–19 record, earning 83 points, which was their highest total since 1973–74, and their sixth division title in the past nine seasons.

Offensively, the Black Hawks were led by Ivan Boldirev, who scored a team high 35 goals and 45 assists for 80 points.  Thirty-seven-year-old Stan Mikita earned 59 points in 76 games to finish second in team scoring, while 22-year-old Ted Bulley had a very solid rookie season, scoring 23 goals and 51 points in 79 games.  Another rookie, Doug Wilson, led the defense, scoring 14 goals and 34 points, while Bob Murray also scored 14 goals, along with 17 assists from the blueline.  Keith Magnuson had a team high 145 penalty minutes, while John Marks led Chicago with a +27 rating.

In goal, Tony Esposito once again had the majority of playing time, winning 28 games, along with 5 shutouts and a 2.63 GAA.

Season standings

Game log

Playoffs
Since the Hawks won their division, they were given a bye in the NHL Preliminary Round, and advanced straight to the NHL quarter-finals.  Their first round opponent was the Boston Bruins, who finished in first place in the Adams Division with 113 points.  The series opened at the Boston Garden, and the Bruins struck first, easily winning the first game by a 6–1 score.  Chicago forced the second game into overtime, however, the Bruins would be victorious once again, this time winning 4–3 to take a 2–0 series lead.  The series moved to Chicago Stadium for the next two games, but it was Boston who stayed hot, as they defeated the Hawks 4–3 in overtime once again in the third game.  The Bruins dominated the fourth game, winning 5–2, to sweep the series.  This was the third straight season that the Black Hawks were swept out of their first playoff round, as the team saw their playoff losing streak reach twelve games.

Boston Bruins 4, Chicago Black Hawks 0

Player stats

Regular season
Scoring

Goaltending

Playoffs
Scoring

Goaltending

Note: Pos = Position; GP = Games played; G = Goals; A = Assists; Pts = Points; +/- = plus/minus; PIM = Penalty minutes; PPG = Power-play goals; SHG = Short-handed goals; GWG = Game-winning goals
      MIN = Minutes played; W = Wins; L = Losses; T = Ties; GA = Goals-against; GAA = Goals-against average; SO = Shutouts;

Playoff stats

Scoring leaders

Goaltending

Draft picks
Chicago's draft picks at the 1977 NHL amateur draft at the Mount Royal Hotel in Montreal, Quebec.

References

Sources
Hockey-Reference
Rauzulu's Street
Goalies Archive
HockeyDB
National Hockey League Guide & Record Book 2007

Chicago Blackhawks seasons
Chicago Blackhawks
Chicago Blackhawks
Smythe Division champion seasons